Frederick Henry Townsend  (25 February 1868 – 11 December 1920)  was a British illustrator, cartoonist and art editor of Punch.

Career

Townsend illustrated the second edition of Charlotte Brontë's 1847 novel Jane Eyre, A Child's History of England and Gryll Grange, and Nathaniel Hawthorne's House of the Seven Gables  in 1902. Also an edition (1907) of Kipling's The Brushwood Boy and the 1903 edition of Arthur Conan Doyle's The Sign of Four. Townsend also contributed cartoons to Punch, becoming its art editor for fifteen years from 1905 until his death.

He was a member of the Chelsea Arts Club (since its foundation in 1891) and the Arts Club (from 1908). In later life he became interested in etching and in 1915 he was elected as an associate of the Royal Society of Painter-Etchers and Engravers (ARE), having studied etching under Sir Frank Short about two years earlier.

Townsend was one of the leading illustrators selected by Percy Bradshaw for inclusion in his The Art of the Illustrator which presented a separate portfolio for each of twenty illustrators.

He died on 11 December 1920 and was buried in a family grave on the eastern side of Highgate Cemetery.

Works as illustrator 
Townsend illustrated the following works:
 A Social Departure (1890), An American Girl in London (1891), Two Girls on a Barge (1981), The Simple Adventures of a Memsahib (1893), The Path of a Star (1899), Those Delightful Americans (1902), by Sara Jeannette Duncan
 The Burglars' Club: A Romance in Twelve Chronicles
 A Child's History of England
 The Following of the Star: A Romance
 Gryll Grange
 Jane Eyre (second edition)
 Jill: A Flower Girl
 Mr. Punch at Home: The Comic Side of Domestic Life
 The Old Maids' Club
 Secrets of the Sword
 The Joneses and the Asterisks: A Story in Monologue. By Gerald Campbell
 Select Conversations with an Uncle, now Extinct.. By H. G. Wells
 THEY by Rudyard Kipling, 1st edition 1905, published by MacMillan & Co Ltd, London

Notes

References

External links 

 
Townsend's Illustrations from Punch in HeidICON
 
 
 
 Lambiek Comiclopedia article.

British cartoonists
1868 births
1920 deaths
Burials at Highgate Cemetery
Punch (magazine) cartoonists